Sexual themes have become prominent in the media, print advertisements, television, video games and other child-friendly mediums. Children are more likely to come across sexually explicit material online intentionally or unintentionally. The large quantity of explicit sexual content online increases the likelihood of young people to experience early sexual debuts or to have sexual experiences at a young age. Young people who frequently engage with explicit sexual content, which exhibit violent and objectifying themes, are more likely to imitate risky and violent sexual practices and to be more accepting of sexual objectification in society. They are also more likely to perceive other people's values and worth solely based on sex appeal.

Explicit sexual material, particularly pornography, impacts young people's wellbeing, sexual practices, attitudes and social relationships. The exposure to explicit sexual content has been associated with addiction, poor self-esteem, devalued intimacy, objectification, increasing divorce rates and engagement in unprotected sex. The use of pornography has also been associated with discovering one's own sexuality, reducing repressed feelings about sex and sexuality, being more open-minded to how others express their sexualities and being more open-minded to diverse forms of sex.

Either way, knowledge about this topic is tentative, due to a lack of empirical studies. There is no evidence that watching pornography would be harmful to minors. Instead, there are many unfounded claims, suppositions, and speculations. Obstacles to performing such research are insurmountable, thus possibly it could never be known.

Cultural stimulus 
According to the American Psychological Association (APA), sexualization occurs: when a person's value is solely defined by his or her sexual appeal or behavior; when a person's physical attractiveness equates to being sexy; when a person is objectified for sexual use; or when sexuality is inappropriately imposed upon a person, such as a child.

The increased ubiquity of sexualized material depicting children and early adolescents is evident in the internet and in other forms of media—images, movies, advertisements, television, music, music lyrics and games. Sexualization is also visible in subtle forms such as marketing materials for clothing, make-up and toys, such as dolls.

Sexualization may occur directly or indirectly through these platforms. Direct sexualization occurs when the way a child dresses up and poses for advertisements draws attention to adult sexual features. Indirect child sexualization occurs when sexualized advertising and popular culture materials target adults.

Exposure to public platforms 

The sexual lifestyles and behaviors of young people are reflective of sexual themes and content in electronic, print and social media platforms. They also reflect themes and norms in the physical and social environment. Young people are more likely to imitate the behaviors that they observe. They lack the full capacity to deal with sexual themes and representations mentally, emotionally and physically, which make it difficult for them to discern between what are acceptable according to societal norms and what are not acceptable standards in society. Children and adolescents who are exposed to explicit sexual material are also more likely to encounter sexual experiences at an early age.

Children are more likely to be exposed to pornography and other forms of explicit sexual content online as they have easy access to technologies that enable them to connect to the internet, where these resources are widely available.

Pornographic concepts can influence social norms, popular culture, music videos, movies, advertising and fashion, which appeal to young people. Pornography also conveys themes in relation to gender, sexual health, power, bodies, pleasure, consent, sexuality and sex which can influence young people's expectations of sex. It also portrays pleasure, respect and consent in highly sexual and misrepresented ways.

Young people are more likely to encounter sexualized content in video games and social media as these devices appeal to young populations. These devices are also sanctioned or permitted by parents. Some video games may depict violent sexual themes, and time spent on social media may increase the chances of young people to encounter pornographic material or other sexually explicit content.

Exposure

Sexual knowledge, awareness and exploration 
Developing a natural curiosity about sexuality fosters healthy sexual development. Pornography serves as a sexual educator, as well as a main source of knowledge on diverse sexualities and sexual practices.

Pornography fails to educate young people about the reproductive aspects of sex, as well as the ethical negotiations surrounding sexuality, such as consent. It also does not teach young people about relationship skills and safe sexual practices.

Pornographic material may be utilized by young people to pleasure themselves, as well as to explore their sexual identities and other sexual practices. Pornography can teach awareness and can foster acceptance towards personal identities, sexualities and bodies. It also enables those who engage with pornographic content to feel more comfortable expressing themselves in relation to sex and sexuality and to be reassured of their sexual identities.

Attitudes, beliefs and expectations about sex and sexuality 
Expressing liberal sexual attitudes, such as the willingness to engage in premarital sex, casual sex, oral sex or anal sex, is associated with pornographic use. Engaging with pornography also influences expectations about sex, which can shape what society perceives to be pleasurable or conventional. These expectations may cause anxiety or fear if individuals feel uncomfortable engaging in these sexual acts. Expectations shaped by sexually explicit content may also lead to unrealistic understandings of sex and sexuality in society, as well as misrepresentative views of pleasure and acceptable behaviors in relationships.

Sexual themes seen in public platforms, such as the media, advertisements and other marketing material predisposes people to perceive other's values and attractiveness based solely on sex appeal.

Frequent pornographic use has also been associated with increased gender inequality and stronger beliefs in gender stereotypes associated with sex. Pornography has fostered sexist attitudes and sexual objectification, particularly towards women, resulting to negative impacts on how men regard women in society.

Sexual behaviors and practices 
Pornographic exposure has been associated with unsafe sex practices. Unsafe sex practices may include engaging in sexual intercourse without the use of contraceptives, as well as engaging in diverse forms of sexual acts such as anal intercourse, facial ejaculation and intercourse with multiple partners.

Children who have been frequently exposed to explicit sexual content are more likely to engage in the behaviors and practices they observe. They are also more likely to express sexually coercive behaviors such as those depicted in pornographic material.

Using pornography has also been associated with frequent sexting. Young people may view sexting as a means of verbal or emotional communication amongst each other, rather than a means of sharing sexually exposing images of themselves to others. Young people, particularly young girls, may feel pressured to send intimate images of themselves to others. This may elicit feelings of anxiety and discomfort.

Sexual aggression 
Pornographic content has become more aggressive, with most scenes depicting acts of physical and verbal aggression. Themes in pornography exhibit: men showing aggression and control; women being dominated; acts of aggression such as gagging, choking and slapping; degradation and humiliation of women; men getting what they want; women as objects of pleasure; unconventional and unrealistic forms of sex; unsafe and unprotected sexual practices; and engaging in sexual acts with multiple partners.

Pornographic content displays sexual violence against women, which perpetuates sexual harassment to both men and women in society. People who regularly engage with violent pornographic material are more likely to be sexually aggressive compared to those who view non-violent pornographic material or those who do not engage with explicit sexual content at all.

Those who frequently engage with explicit sexual material are also more likely to be sexually aroused by violence.

There has also been a growing trend of younger children who sexually assault other young children due to early or frequent exposure to pornographic content.

Mental health and well-being 
The messages that sexualized materials convey impact how children develop their identity, attitudes and beliefs, as well as their understandings on how society perceives them. Frequent engagement with pornographic content may also foster self-objectification, which is when one perceives his or her own body as an object of others' desires.

Other psychological implications associated with the frequent use of pornographic material and the exposure to other sexualized material include developing depression and low self-esteem. These mental states may stem from the development of eating disorders, which can arise from a damaging perception of one's body image, associated with exposure to sexualized material. Depression and low self-esteem may also stem from body insecurities when one feels like he or she does not embody what society perceives to be attractive. Again, these societal norms are influenced by sexualized material such as women's and men's clothing magazines.

Exposure to sexually explicit images can also pressure young people to take and send sexually exposing images of themselves to others, which may subject them to having their intimate images distributed without consent. This makes them susceptible to cyberbullying, sexual bullying, harassment, sexual abuse, child abuse and sexual exploitation. These consequences may also distress or upset younger children and can damage young people's mental and emotional health, increasing the likelihood of psychological illnesses as well as physical illnesses to manifest.

Research 

How pornographic content and other explicit sexual material impact young people has been the topic of much study and research.

Zillman and Bryant's study aimed to investigate the effect of pornography on adolescents and young adults. They found the exposure to pornography and use of pornographic material to be associated to the following findings: developing a callous perception toward women, considering cases of rape to be less serious, being more accepting of non-marital sex, engaging in diverse sexual practices such as oral or anal sex, becoming more interested in niche pornographic genres, being dissatisfied with one's sexual partner, perceiving sexual infidelity in relationships to be acceptable, devaluing marriage, expressing a decreased desire to have children and showing acceptance of female promiscuity.

In the United Kingdom, the Association of Teachers and Lecturers feels schoolchildren need to be educated about pornography and warned what is reasonable and what is unacceptable. The UK children's commissioner initiated a meta-study conducted by researchers at Middlesex University which concluded that pornography is linked to unrealistic attitudes about sex, beliefs that women are sex objects, more frequent thoughts about sex, and found that children and young people who view pornography tend to hold less progressive gender role attitudes. Miranda Horvath stated about this: "But it is not possible to establish causation from correlational studies, and to say whether pornography is changing or reinforcing attitudes."

Alan McKee's research aimed to examine the range of effects pornography had on consumers. Consumers were asked to specify the effects pornography had on their attitudes toward sexuality. A majority of the respondents felt that pornography had a positive effect on their attitudes toward sexuality, while minority of the respondents felt that it had a negative effect. The main positive effects pornography had on consumers, in respective order, included: relieving repressed feelings about sex, becoming more open minded about sex, becoming more tolerant of other people's sexualities, receiving pleasure, developing educational insights, sustaining sexual interests in long-term relationships, becoming more mindful of one's partner's sexual desires, discovering one's personal identity, discovering a community, and making it easier to talk about sex to one's partner. The common negative effects pornography had on consumers included: developing objectifying attitudes towards people, developing unrealistic sexual expectations, developing relationship problems, losing interest in sex and developing addiction.

McCormack and Wignall interviewed participants who started watching pornography at early ages. Their study focused on determining how pornography was experienced as a leisure activity. Based on their findings, the study participants perceived watching pornography to be a platform for education, entertainment and exploration.

In their study, Bridges, Wosnitzer, Scharrer, Sun and Liberman found acts of physical aggression among men to be frequently evident in pornographic films. Aggression, which was mainly displayed by men, was found to evoke neutral or pleasurable responses by respondents who were mostly women. In another study, Crabbe & Corlett found that young men believed pornographic material to be reflective of sexual practices in reality. These findings adhere to the increasing rates of sexual abuse and the growing trend of children engaging in sexually abusive behaviors towards other children, including their own younger relatives and acquaintances.

The role pornography watching plays in the development of children and youth is basically unknown, due to a lack of empirical studies.  This essentially confirms the thesis from Not in Front of the Children: harmful to minors is an often heard claim which completely lacks evidence. There are considerable ethical problems with performing such research. Since those problems are a huge obstacle, it is likely that such research will not be allowed, thus possibly it could never be known. Rory Reid (UCLA) declared "Universities don't want their name on the front page of a newspaper for an unethical study exposing minors to porn."

The PhD thesis of Marleen J.D. Katayama-Klaassen (2020), at the University of Amsterdam, found a low correlation, and could not show causality.

Peter and Valkenburg (2016) 20 years systematic review: its positive conclusions are tentative, and causality cannot be shown. Brown and Wisco (2019) systematic review: idem ditto.

References

See also 

 Harmful to Minors, book by Judith Levine
 Not in Front of the Children, book by Marjorie Heins

External links 
Adolescents and Pornography: A Review of 20 Years of Research, a review of 20 years of research on adolescents and pornography.

Research on the effects of pornography
Adolescent sexuality in the United States